Belize–Guatemala relations are the bilateral relations between Belize and Guatemala. Guatemala established relations with Belize in 1991, ten years after Belizean independence. Belize has an embassy in Guatemala City while Guatemala has an embassy in Belize City. The two countries have had a long-standing dispute over the territory of Belize. Both countries are members of the Organization of American States and the Community of Latin American and Caribbean States.

Territorial dispute

The Guatemalan government has demanded several times since 1940 that the UK government give up Belize and hand it over to Guatemala. The British government has refused and Guatemala has made several threats to invade Belize.

See also 
 Belize–Guatemala border
 2016 Belize-Guatemala border standoff

References 

 
Bilateral relations of Guatemala
Guatemala